The Kelsall River is a river in the U.S. State of Alaska and the Canadian province of British Columbia. It is a tributary of the Chilkat River, flowing into it in the Haines Borough of Alaska.

See also
List of rivers of Alaska
List of rivers of British Columbia
List of rivers of Yukon

References

Rivers of Haines Borough, Alaska
Rivers of the Boundary Ranges
Rivers of Alaska
Rivers of Yukon